Trey Alan Hodges (born June 29, 1978) is an American former professional baseball pitcher. He played in Major League Baseball (MLB) for the Atlanta Braves and for the Hanshin Tigers of the Nippon Professional Baseball (NPB).

Career
In , Hodges pitched for the Double-A Frisco RoughRiders in the Texas Rangers organization. On February 27, he signed a contract with the independent Lancaster Barnstormers of the Atlantic League.

He last played professionally in 2009 with the independent Lancaster Barnstormers.

His brother, Kevin Hodges, also played in the major leagues and Nippon Professional Baseball.
Trey pitched at LSU where he won a national title and MOP in the 2000 College World Series.

References

External links

1978 births
Living people
Baseball players from Houston
Major League Baseball pitchers
Nippon Professional Baseball pitchers
Atlanta Braves players
Hanshin Tigers players
Blinn Buccaneers baseball players
LSU Tigers baseball players
Jamestown Jammers players
Myrtle Beach Pelicans players
Richmond Braves players
Rochester Red Wings players
Frisco RoughRiders players
Lancaster Barnstormers players
American expatriate baseball players in Japan
College World Series Most Outstanding Player Award winners